The Miss Earth Trinidad and Tobago is a beauty pageant has been held since 2011. It is responsible for selecting the country's representative to Miss Earth, which is an annual international beauty pageant promoting environmental awareness.

History

Early years
Trinidad and Tobago debuted in Miss Earth 2004. However, the organization responsible for sending a delegate failed to send annually.

2015
In 2015, Trinidad and Tobago returned to Miss Earth with Danielle Dolabaille as the delegate in the Miss Earth 2015. The organization responsible is under Mr. Paul Singh. Singh failed to select and send a delegate to Miss Earth the following year.

2018-present
Stephanie Lee Pack (former Miss Universe Trinidad and Tobago 1974) has been appointed as national director of Miss Earth Trinidad and Tobago since 2018.

Titleholders
Color key

The winner of Miss Earth Trinidad & Tobago represents her country at Miss Earth. On occasion, when the winner does not qualify (due to age) for either contest, a runner-up is sent. In 2004 and 2007 the official candidate selected by another organization.

References

External links
Official website

Beauty pageants in Trinidad and Tobago
Trinidad and Tobago
Trinidad and Tobago awards